Hélène Cuvigny, is a French papyrologist, specialist of the eastern Egyptian desert in Roman times.

Biography 
As part of a research project of the Institut Français d'Archéologie Orientale in Cairo, she was entrusted in 1994 with the exploration of the Roman garrisons network marking out the paths connecting Qift (formerly Coptos), on the Nile, to the ports of Qusayr al-Qadîm (Myos Hormos) and Berenice on the Red Sea.

She is responsible for the research program "Ostracon of the eastern desert" within the Institute of Papyrology of the Paris-Sorbonne University.

In 1995, she was appointed a member of the scientific council of the Institut Français d'Archéologie Orientale in Cairo. She was part of the "commission to consider the nominations for French member of the Institut français d'archéologie orientale in Cairo" between 1997 and 2000.

Publications

Books

Articles

References

External links 
 Hélène Cuvigny on data.bnf.fr
 Qu'apprend-on des tessons de poteries?
 Pourquoi les textes sur ostraca trouvés dans les forts romains du désert de Bérénice n'en disent-ils pas davantage sur le commerce érythréen ? (video)
 Selection of texts
 Institut de papyrologie de la Sorbonne

20th-century births
Living people
Year of birth missing (living people)
French papyrologists
French archaeologists
French women archaeologists
Members of the Institut Français d'Archéologie Orientale